Cojot is a documentary in production by Boaz Dvir that details the untold story of Michel Cojot.

Synopsis 
The character study follows Holocaust survivor Michel Cojot through post-war life as a Parisian banker, a Nazi hunter on the trail of Klaus Barbie, and a pivotal player in the Operation Entebbe, as he and his son Olivier, 12 at the time, were among those held hostage by the terrorists.

Production 
Work on the film is ongoing. “Few people get a shot at righting history,” Dvir explained in regards to his motivation for the project. “Michel claimed two. In 1975-76, he was catapulted twice onto the global stage. He certainly made the most of his second chance in Entebbe.” Dvir interviewed 24 people around the world, making sure that all information was confirmed by at least two sources. The interviewees include Michel Cojot's family members, Nazi hunters Serge and Beate Klarsfeld, Operation Entebbe lead pilot Joshua Shani, French historians Vincent Duclert and Shmuel Trigano, hidden-children expert Raphaël Delpard, and bestselling British author Saul David.

Besides directing the project, Dvir serves as producer, writer and composer. Furthermore, he has teamed up with Anita Gabrosek and Richie Sherman, who serve as the film's editor and director of photography, respectively, and Matthew Tiramani for music.  University of Florida professor Gayle Zachmann, a French and Jewish Studies specialist, serves as historical consultant and co-producer. Matthew Einstein, CEO of Tradition Pictures and former director of development for Atmosphere Entertainment, serves as a producer on "Cojot".
The film will be narrated by Judd Nelson.

Release

A 20-minute preview of the film was screened at the American Jewish Historical Society in New York City in March 2016. Recently, the Mark G. Loeb Center for Lifelong Learning and the Louise D. & Morton J. Macks Center for Jewish Education are hosting a preview in Baltimore.

The first rough cut screening took place at Penn State Great Valley in November 2017.
The movie's rough cut was also screened on April 7, at Penn State Abington and May 2, in Baltimore, at the Beth El Congregation. On April 12, 2018, star and narrator of the film, Judd Nelson came to Penn State University to screen the movie and answer student and community questions. There was another screening of the film at Beth Chaim Synagogue in Malvern, PA on September 12, 2018.
The film was screened by the University of Florida's Jewish Studies Department at the Hippodrome Theater in downtown Gainesville on November 15, 2018.

Two rough-cut screenings were held in November 2019 (November 5, and November 10). The November 5th event was at Penn State Paterno Library's Foster Auditorium. The event was hosted by Penn State's Social Studies Education program. The Reading Jewish Film Series, co-sponsored by Reading's Trinity Lutheran Church, held its sold-out “Cojot” rough-cut screening at a local movie theater November 10. Both screenings featured a post-screening discussion with the film's director, Dvir.

The Jewish Federation of Brevard in Melbourne, Fla., hosted a rough-cut screening March 12, 2020, at a local movie theater. After the screening, Dvir answered the audience's questions and signed copies of his latest book, “Saving Israel: The Unknown Story of Smuggling Weapons and Winning a Nation’s Independence” (Rowman & Littlefield, 2020).

“Cojot” was incorporated into the Pennsylvania Department of Education and Penn State's Holocaust Education Initiative's offerings to the Commonwealth's teachers along with another of Dvir's films (“A Wing and A Prayer”). They were both shown at the Pittsburgh Holocaust Center's annual teacher training in July 2019 as well.

See also 
 Operation Thunderbolt (film)
 Victory at Entebbe (film)
 Raid on Entebbe (film)

References

External links 
 

2018 films
2018 documentary films
Films about hijackings
American documentary films
Operation Entebbe
Films directed by Boaz Dvir
2010s American films